Concord Municipal Airport  is a public-use airport located  east of the central business district of Concord, a city in Merrimack County, New Hampshire, United States. 

It is included in the Federal Aviation Administration (FAA) National Plan of Integrated Airport Systems for 2017–2021, in which it is categorized as a local general aviation facility.

This general aviation airport is publicly owned by the City of Concord.

Facilities 

 Runway 17/35: 6,005 x 100 ft (1,830 x 30 m), surface: asphalt
 Runway 12/30: 3,200 x 75 ft (975 x 23 m), surface: asphalt

Concord Aviation Services provides full and self-service 100LL fuel and full-service Jet A fuel. There are long-term tie-down spots for multiple small aircraft on the southern part of the ramp, and two hangars for year-round aircraft storage.

Concord Aviation Services does mechanical work in its main hangar, on both its own aircraft and those of customers.

References 
Concord Municipal Airport, page at City of Concord website

External links 

Airports in New Hampshire
Transportation buildings and structures in Merrimack County, New Hampshire
Buildings and structures in Concord, New Hampshire